Makuha Ka sa Tikim (English: Be Taken With The Taste) is a Philippine cooking-reality television program on ABS-CBN in partnership with Knorr, a cooking product of  California Manufacturing Company (Unilever Bestfoods), one of Unilever Philippines' subsidiaries. The show hosted by Eula Valdez, Jean Garcia and Eugene Domingo. The show claims to be the first televised Philippine cooking showdown. It aired from September 10, 2005 to November 24, 2006. Hundreds applied for the show but only 27 were selected.

Hosts
Cherry Pie Picache
Eugene Domingo
Eula Valdez

Notes
Eugene Domingo replaced Jean Garcia as a host when she decided to move to GMA Network.

Former host
Jean Garcia (removed from the show due to GMA Network exclusive contract)

References

Philippine cooking television series
ABS-CBN original programming
2005 Philippine television series debuts
2006 Philippine television series endings
Filipino-language television shows